
Herbert Jenner (23 February 1806 – 30 July 1904) was an English barrister. As an amateur cricketer he played first-class cricket from 1825 to 1838. He changed his name to Herbert Jenner-Fust in 1864.

Life
Herbert Jenner was the eldest son of the judge Herbert Jenner-Fust, Dean of the Arches. He was educated at Eton College, where he was first noted as a schoolboy cricketer playing against Harrow School in 1822, and Trinity Hall, Cambridge. In 1827, he captained Cambridge University in the inaugural University Match at Lord's.

Jenner entered Lincoln's Inn, and was called to the bar in 1831. He became an advocate of Doctors' Commons in 1835.

Cricket career
Jenner was an all-rounder who was right-handed as both batsman and bowler.  He was an underarm bowler but his pace is unknown.  He kept wicket when not bowling and is said to have been one of the "finest amateur wicketkeepers".

In the 1820s, Jenner did not wear gloves or pads while keeping wicket.  These protections were gradually introduced in response to the development of roundarm bowling from 1827.  Until then, the role of the wicketkeeper had been "offensive" rather than "defensive" in that he was primarily concerned with looking for stumping chances, but the increased pace of roundarm forced wicketkeepers to improve their ability to stop the ball and so prevent byes.  By 1836, the Kent wicketkeeper Ned Wenman was using gloves but it is not known if Jenner himself adopted them in the latter part of his career.

In first-class cricket, he was associated with Cambridge University, Kent XIs and MCC. He played for several predominantly amateur teams including the Gentlemen in the Gentlemen v Players series.

Jenner made 36 known appearances in first-class matches from 1825 to 1838.  He scored 842 runs with a highest score of 75.  He is credited with 75 wickets, including a best performance of seven wickets in an innings; he took five wickets in an innings on at least five occasions.  As a wicket-keeper, he took 24 catches and made 17 stumpings.

References

Sources
 
 

1806 births
1904 deaths
People educated at Eton College
English cricketers
English cricketers of 1787 to 1825
English cricketers of 1826 to 1863
Gentlemen cricketers
Marylebone Cricket Club cricketers
Kent cricketers
Cambridge University cricketers
Alumni of Trinity Hall, Cambridge
Married v Single cricketers
Gentlemen of Kent cricketers
Wicket-keepers
English barristers